Megachile dariensis is a species of bee in the family Megachilidae. It was described by Friese in 1903, and renamed by Pasteels in 1965.

References

dariensis
Insects described in 1903